Jarrod Wallace (born 23 July 1991) is an Australian professional rugby league footballer who plays as a  for the Dolphins in the NRL.

He previously played for the Brisbane Broncos and the Gold Coast Titans in the National Rugby League and has also played for Queensland in State of Origin.

Early life
Wallace was born and raised on the Gold Coast, Queensland, Australia.

He played his first junior rugby league for the Runaway Bay Seagulls at age 4. At age 13, Wallace moved to Coffs Harbour, New South Wales where his father played local rugby league. While there, he played junior rugby league with the Sawtell Panthers before signing with the Gold Coast Titans at age 16, and moving back to Queensland. Wallace has two daughters Lara (born 2012) and Petyon (b. 2014) with a former partner. He married Miss World Australia winner Courtney Thorpe in early 2019. Thorpe welcomed their daughter Kennedy Grace in August 2019. Wallace and Thorpe split in September 2021.

Early career
He played for the Titan's Mal meninga cup side and later player 17 games for their NYC side in 2010. He signed with the Brisbane Broncos for the 2011 season and spent the entire season playing for the club's NYC side.

First grade career

2012
Wallace was elevated into the Broncos' first grade squad and played in two pre-season trials. He started the 2012 season playing for the Broncos' feeder side the Norths Devils in the Intrust Super Cup. He was named in the 2012 Queensland Residents side to take on their New South Wales counterparts in the curtain raiser to Game 3 of the 2012 State of Origin series at Suncorp Stadium.

Wallace made his National Rugby League debut in the Broncos' 40–22 round 14 win against the Sydney Roosters at the Sydney Football Stadium.

2013
In 2013, Wallace played for the Norths Devils and Brisbane throughout the season playing the majority with the Devils. He first played in 2013 against the South Sydney Rabbitohs in round 8 and played 5 games latter in the season as well.

2014
Wallace started the season by sitting on the bench for the first two games against Canterbury-Bankstown and North Queensland for the whole 80 minutes, then in round 3 he finally got on the field against the Sydney Roosters. Wallace played 14 games including one start against the West Tigers during the origin period.

2015
Wallace didn't play any pre-season or round 1 due to shoulder surgery. In round 2, he returned, then he was again selected in round 3 against the North Queensland Cowboys in which he made more running metres than Australian test forward Matt Scott and in round 4 against the New Zealand Warriors Wallace scored his first NRL try. A week later, he got his first start for the year when Adam Blair was injured. In round 6, Wallace was placed on report for a chicken wing tackle and was suspended for a week. In round 19, Wallace scored his 2nd career try against the Wests Tigers following a short pass from Adam Blair. A day after his 24th Birthday Wallace scored his third try against Gold Coast Titans in round 20. In rounds 21-22, he started at prop due to Blair being suspended. Then for the remainder of the season Wallace played off the bench including the 2015 NRL Grand Final loss to the North Queensland Cowboys. Wallace played in 25 of the Broncos 27 games and scored 3 tries.

2016
Wallace in January was selected in the QAS emerging Maroons squad. On 5 February, Wallace was one of eight players from the Maroons emerging camp who was banned from representing Queensland for 12-months after breaking a curfew in Brisbane. On 21 July, Wallace signed a three-year deal with the Gold Coast Titans commencing in 2017. Wallace finished 2016 playing in all 26 games and scoring two tries in his final season at the Brisbane Broncos.

2017
Wallace made his debut for the Gold Coast Titans in round 1 in a 32-18 loss to the Sydney Roosters at Cbus Super Stadium. For Game 1 of the 2017 State of Origin series Wallace was selected as 18th Man for Queensland, For Game 2 and 3 of the series he was selected both games as starting Prop. In the third game, Wallace scored the match sealing try for Queensland against New South Wales from a Cameron Munster offload to secure Queensland 11th series in the last 12 series.

2018
In round 5 of the 2018 NRL season, Wallace scored his first NRL try for the Gold Coast in the 32-20 win over the Manly-Warringah Sea Eagles at Marley Brown Oval. In round 8 against the Cronulla-Sutherland Sharks, he played his 100th NRL games in the Titans' 9-10 loss at Robina Stadium.

2019
Wallace played 21 games for the Gold Coast in the 2019 NRL season as the club endured a horror year on and off the field finishing last on the table.

2020
Wallace played 17 games for the Gold Coast in the 2020 NRL season as the club finished ninth on the table and missed out on the finals.

2021
In round 25 of the 2021 NRL season, Wallace was sent to the sin bin for fighting during the Gold Coast's 44-0 victory over the New Zealand Warriors.

Wallace played 25 games for the Gold Coast in the 2021 NRL season including the club's elimination final loss against the Sydney Roosters.

2022
On 8 June, Wallace signed a two-year deal to join the newly admitted Dolphins (NRL) side ahead of the 2023 NRL season.
In round 16 of the 2022 NRL season, Wallace was sent off for a dangerous tackle in the Gold Coast's 38-12 loss against Newcastle.

Statistics

(* denotes season still competing)

References

External links
Gold Coast Titans profile
Brisbane Broncos profile

1991 births
Living people
Australian people of English descent
Australian rugby league players
Brisbane Broncos players
Dolphins (NRL) players
Gold Coast Titans players
Norths Devils players
Rugby league players from Gold Coast, Queensland
Queensland Rugby League State of Origin players
Rugby league props